Pankhali Union is a union parishad of Dacope Upazila in Khulna District of Bangladesh.

References

Unions of Dacope Upazila
Populated places in Khulna Division
Populated places in Khulna District